Wrestling competitions at the 2019 Pan American Games in Lima were held between August 7 and 10, 2019 at the Miguel Grau Coliseum in the Villa Deportiva Regional del Callao cluster.

The competition is split into two disciplines, Freestyle and Greco-Roman which were further divided into different weight categories. Men competed in both disciplines whereas women only took part in the freestyle events, with 18 gold medals awarded (12 for men and six for women). Wrestling has been contested at every Pan American Games.

Medal table

Medalists

Men's events
Freestyle

Greco-Roman

 Shalom Villegas of Venezuela originally won the silver medal, but he was disqualified for doping violations.

Women's events
Freestyle

Qualification

A total of 150 wrestlers qualified to compete at the games. The winner of each weight category at the 2018 South American Games and 2018 Central American and Caribbean Games and the top three at the 2018 Pan American Championships qualified for the Games. The top three at the 2019 Pan American Championships also qualified. The host country (Peru) was guaranteed a spot in each event, but its athletes were required to compete in both the 2018 and 2019 Pan American Championship. A further six wildcards (four men and two women) were awarded to nations without any qualified athlete but took part in the qualification tournaments.

See also
Wrestling at the 2020 Summer Olympics

References

External links
Results book UWW
Results book Panam Sports

 
Wrestling
Pan American Games
2019
International wrestling competitions hosted by Peru